The Codru-Moma Mountains (Munții Codru-Moma) are a part of the Apuseni Mountains. They are specifically located in the Arad and Bihor counties, within the Western Romanian Carpathians of Crișana, Romania.

References

Mountain ranges of Romania
Mountain ranges of the Western Romanian Carpathians
Western Romanian Carpathians